These are the Poland national football team results and fixtures.

Poland national football team results

Pre World War II

1947–1979

1980–1999

2000–2019

2020–present

See also
 Poland national football team

References

External links 
Poland - International Matches - Overview - RSSSF

 

Poland national football team matches